"Delirious" is a song by American musician Prince, from his 1982 album, 1999. It was the album's third single, and Prince's second Top 10 hit, reaching No. 8 in the US during the fall of 1983. The success of the single was boosted by the runaway success of the previous single, "Little Red Corvette", and also because DJs often played the first three album tracks in sequence, which just happened to be the order of the singles released from the album.

Background
"Delirious" is a standard 8-bar blues number that tells how Prince is being driven crazy by a beautiful woman. The song teases the listener with sexual metaphors, hidden enough to avoid being censored. The track begins with a trademark Linn drum machine loop and a bit of synth bass before the keyboard hook introduces the song. A rubbery bass guitar gives the track a rockabilly feel, which Prince had experimented earlier on "Jack U Off" from Controversy. The track ends suddenly with the sound effect of a baby cooing. In live performances over the years, Prince would later add live horns to the song, making it into more of a swing number. The 7-inch single release of the song included a poster bag with a 1983 calendar and images of Prince.

Cash Box called it "a bona fide finger-popper."

The B-side to the track is "Horny Toad", which is very similar in rockabilly style and instrumentation. Some of the sexually charged lyrics were interpreted as sadistic at the time and were the source of some controversy. The track was included on The Hits/The B-Sides in 1993 and 1999 Deluxe and Super Deluxe edition in 2019.

Appearances in other media
The sound effect of a baby cooing is sampled from Jac Holzman's "Happy Baby", and was also sampled in 1986's "Baby Love" by Regina and 1998's "Are You That Somebody?" by Aaliyah.
The song was used in the 1983 Cheech and Chong film Still Smokin'.
The song can heard at the beginning of MGM's 1991 film of the same name.
The song is sampled in Girl Talk's 2010 album All Day.
The instrumental parts of the song was used as the theme song to the Captain Kangaroo show-within-a-show, Hello America, in the 1980s.
The sound effect of a baby cooing is featured in a techno song during the 2007 It's Always Sunny in Philadelphia episode "Frank Sets Sweet Dee on Fire".

Charts

References
 Uptown: The Vault – The Definitive Guide to the Musical World of Prince: Nilsen Publishing 2004, 

1982 songs
1983 singles
Prince (musician) songs
Songs written by Prince (musician)
Song recordings produced by Prince (musician)
Warner Records singles